Thor Næve Lange (9 April 1851 – 22 February 1915) was a Danish author.

Biography
He was born in Copenhagen. About 1877 he went to Moscow as Danish consul. His works include translations from ancient Greek, Old French, and Russian, and he made a good translation of Longfellow's Golden Legend (3d ed. 1891). He also compiled Skildringer fra den russiske Literatur (1886). His original volumes include: En maaned i Orienten; Flygtize Skizzer (1887); Skitser og Phantaseir (1890); and a collection of his poems, Gennem farret Glas (1894).

Notes

References

External links
 

1851 births
1915 deaths
Danish male writers
19th-century Danish translators
20th-century Danish translators
19th-century male writers